The 2015 Nippon Professional Baseball season was the 66th season since the NPB was reorganized in 1950. In the Central League, the Yakult Swallows claimed the pennant and defeated the Yomiuri Giants in the final stage of the Climax Series. In the Pacific League, the Fukuoka SoftBank Hawks won the penant and defeated the Chiba Lotte Marines in the final stage of the Climax Series.

Incidents
A gambling scandal involving members of the Yomiuri Giants was reported in October. Pitchers Satoshi Fukuda, Shoki Kasahara, and Ryuya Matsumoto were found to have bet on both NBP games and Major League Baseball games, as well as high school baseball.

Regular season standings

Climax Series

Note: In each league's stepladder playoff system (Climax Series), all games in that series are held at the higher seed's home stadium. The team with the higher regular-season standing also advanced if the round ended in a tie.

First stage
The regular season league champions, the Fukuoka SoftBank Hawks (PL) and the Tokyo Yakult Swallows (CL), received byes to the championship round.

Central League

Pacific League

Final stage
The regular season league champions, the Fukuoka SoftBank Hawks (PL) and the Tokyo Yakult Swallows (CL), received a one-game advantage.

Central League

Pacific League

Japan Series

League leaders

Central League

Pacific League

See also
2015 Korea Professional Baseball season
2015 Major League Baseball season

References

 
2015 in baseball